The following is a list of floods in Pakistan.

 1992 India–Pakistan floods
 In 1995 heavy monsoon rains occurred in mid-July. Due to this Indus River and other rivers and canals started to flood. The rains stopped in time. Otherwise they would have caused more damage.
 In 2003, Sindh province was badly affected when above normal monsoon rainfall caused flooding in the province; urban flooding also hit Karachi where two days of rainfall of  created havoc in the city, while Thatta District was the worst hit where  rainfall caused flash floods in the district. At least 484 people were killed and some 4,476 villages in the province were affected.
 In 2007, Khyber Pakhtunkhwa, Sindh and coastal Balochistan were badly affected due to monsoon rainfall. Sindh and coastal Balochistan were affected by Cyclone Yemyin in June and then torrential rains in July and August, while Khyber Pakhtunkhwa was affected by melting glaciers and heavy rainfall in July and August. At least 130 people died and 2,000 were displaced in Khyber Pakhtunkhwa in July and 22 people died in August, while 815 people died in Balochistan and Sindh due to flash floods.
 2009 Karachi floods
 In 2010, almost all of Pakistan was affected when massive flooding, caused by record breaking rains, hit Khyber Pakhtunkhwa and Punjab. The number of people affected by the flooding exceeds the combined total affected by the 2004 Indian Ocean earthquake and tsunami, the 2005 Kashmir earthquake and the 2010 Haiti earthquake. At least 2,000 people died in the flood and almost 20 million people were affected by it.
 In September 2011, at least 361 people were killed, some 5.3 million people and 1.2 million homes affected as well 1.7 million acres of arable land inundated when massive floods swept across the province of Sindh as a result of monsoon rains.
 In September 2012, more than 100 people were killed, and thousands of homes destroyed, with thousands of acres of arable land affected when flooding affected Khyber Pakhtunkhwa, southern Punjab and northern Sindh, resulting from monsoon rains.
 In September 2013, more than 80 people died due to the flooding.
 In September 2014, due to massive rain, flooding affected Jammu and Kashmir as well as in Punjab. Constituted flood situation in River Chanab and River Jhelum.
 2019 Pakistan floods and storms
 In August 2020, Karachi received the heaviest rain in a single day ever in its history when 231 mm rain lashed out in just 12 hours. During August 2020, only Karachi received 484 mm (19 inches) rain. It is the highest rainfall record over the last 90 years. Rainwater and overflowed water from nullahs and drains flooded most of the main roads and streets in residential locations, a significant number of residential areas including urban slums and villages in peri-urban areas, that gravely disrupted the people’s lives.
 2021 Islamabad flooding
 From June to August 2022, flooding affected most of Pakistan. The provinces of Balochistan and Sindh were worst hit, while floods had also affected other parts of the country as far north as Kashmir. At least 1,500 people died in the flooding with 16 million children affected.

See also 
 Climate of Pakistan
 List of deadliest floods
 List of tropical cyclones in Pakistan
 List of extreme weather records in Pakistan

References

 
Pakistan
Climate of Pakistan
Environment of Pakistan
Lists of events in Pakistan